Asperula brachyantha is a species of flowering plant in the family Rubiaceae.

Description 
Asperula brachyantha was first described in 1845 and is endemic to Iran.

References 

brachyantha
Flora of Iran
Taxa named by Pierre Edmond Boissier